Mousquet was a   built for the French Navy in the first decade of the 20th century. Completed in 1903, the ship was initially assigned to the Mediterranean Fleet, but was transferred to the Far East the following year. She was sunk by the Imperial German Navy cruiser  during the Battle of Penang in 1914, a few months after the beginning of the World War I.

Design and description
The Arquebuse class was designed as a faster version of the preceding . The two vertical triple-expansion steam engines each drove one propeller shaft using steam provided by two du Temple Guyot or Normand boilers. Their crew consisted of four officers and fifty-eight enlisted men.

The main armament of the Arquebuse-class ships consisted of a single  gun forward of the bridge and six  Hotchkiss guns in single mounts, three on each broadside. They were fitted with two single rotating mounts for  torpedo tubes on the centerline, one between the funnels and the other on the stern.

Construction and career
Mousquet (Musket) was ordered from Ateliers et Chantiers de la Loire on 14 November 1900 and the ship was laid down in November at its shipyard in Nantes. She was launched on 7 August 1902 and conducted her sea trials during February-May 1903. The ship was commissioned after their completion and was assigned to the Mediterranean Fleet. Mousquet and her sister ship  were used to conduct the navy's first trials with wireless telegraphy. In April 1904, Mousquet was assigned to French Indochina; she traveled there in company with the protected cruiser .

In 1911, Mousquet was serving with the Naval Division of the Far East, based in French Indochina. That year, Mousquet was placed in reserve at Saigon, where she remained laid up until early 1914. She was recommissioned on 5 March to relieve her sister Fronde. She was still on active service at the outbreak of World War I in July 1914.

World War I
At the start of World War I in August 1914, the Naval Division of the Far East included Mousquet, along with the armored cruisers  and Dupleix, D'Iberville, and the destroyers , and Fronde. The unit was based in Saigon in French Indochina. The destroyers and D'Iberville were initially sent to patrol the Strait of Malacca while the armored cruisers were sent north to join the search for the German East Asia Squadron. D'Iberville and the destroyers conducted patrols in the strait for the German unprotected cruiser , which was known to be passing through the area at the time; the French ships failed to locate the German vessel.

In the early hours of 28 October 1914, the German light cruiser  raided Triple Entente warships in the Battle of Penang. Mousquet was approaching the harbor when Emden fled, having torpedoed and sunk the Russian protected cruiser . Mousquet turned away from Emden when the latter opened fire, but the German vessel quickly found the range and scored at least one hit that damaged Mousquets propulsion system. Mousquet returned fire with one of her guns and launched a torpedo, but both missed. The damage from Emdens shell quickly proved to be fatal, and once it became apparent that she was sinking by the bow, the Germans ceased firing and came close by to pick up survivors. Emden lowered a pair of cutters and rescued an officer and 35 men. Another 42 of her crew, including her captain, were killed in the sinking. Two days later, Emden stopped the British steamer  and transferred the survivors to her.

References

Bibliography
 

 

 

 
 

Arquebuse-class destroyers
Ships built in France
1902 ships
Maritime incidents in October 1914
World War I shipwrecks in the Indian Ocean
Shipwrecks in the Strait of Malacca